is a 2009 Japanese sci-fi action B movie written and directed by Noboru Iguchi, visual effects directed by Tsuyoshi Kazuno, and special effects directed by Yoshihiro Nishimura. All three had previously worked together on The Machine Girl, and Nishimura worked on Tokyo Gore Police. The film premiered in theaters on October 3, 2009. The film's theme song is "Lost Control" by Art-School.

The film is about two sisters named Yoshie and Kikue Kasuga, Geishas who get abducted by a steel manufacturer in an attempt to transform them into murderous cyborg assassins.

Plot
The film starts out with an assassination attempt on a political candidate by a Geisha (that turns out to be a robot) and two scantily-clad women wearing Tengu/Goblin masks. The goblin-clad women violently (and phallically) take out the body guards (notably shooting shuriken out their butts) as the politician is menaced and wounded by the robot geisha who has a circular saw blade in her mouth. Suddenly, another person named Yoshie (Aya Kiguchi) appears, reveals herself as a robogeisha, and destroys the villainous robot.

We go back in time to see Yoshie as a servant for her sister Kikue (Hitomi Hasebe), who is a geisha in training. It is later revealed that the two sisters were orphaned, and though they used to be close (with Kikue being the favorite child), they are now enemies. Yoshie is klutzy and ruins Kikue's performance for Hikaru Kageno (Takumi Saito), heir to Kageno Steel Manufacturing.
Despite her klutziness, Kageno is impressed with Yoshie's beauty and becomes more interested when he witnesses her display of superhuman strength when threatened by Kikue.

Eventually, Kageno invites the two sisters to his house, where they are captured by the goblin ladies. The two are forced to fight to the death, and after Kikue wounds and actually threatens to kill her sister, Yoshie snaps and knocks out Kikue, once again displaying superhuman physical prowess. Accordingly, Kageno and his father begin training Yoshie to become an assassin for the company along with many other young Geisha-type women, and she quickly becomes the head assassin. They are told that Kageno Steel seeks to use them to kill terrorists and other national threats in an effort to create an "Ideal World". Kikue, meanwhile, is relegated to the role of servant to the organization.

Nonetheless, Kikue strives to outdo her sister and shows a greater propensity for violence than Yoshie. Eventually, both sisters frequently undergo surgery to become cyborgs (Robogeisha), with machine-gun busts and other robotic enhancements. On their first mission, however, Kikue is severely wounded when she selflessly saves Yoshie from being killed by one of their target's bodyguards. Later, Kikue explains to Kageno that though Yoshie annoys her, she still loves her sister. Nonetheless, Kikue will never be able to recuperate sufficiently to serve as an assassin.

The story reaches a turning point when Yoshie is sent on a mission to kill a small group of elderly people and their young caretaker living near the Kageno Steel building. The seniors then reveal that they are the relatives of the Kageno Steel's geisha and goblin assassins and that Kageno Steel has actually been abducting these girls to serve their own ends. Yoshie confronts Kageno and his father, who confirms the story. Then, the duo threatens to kill Kikue unless Yoshie completes what turns out to be a suicide mission. The other girls also have been devoid of a conscience and humanity for so long that they decline to return to their families, remaining geisha assassins.

Yoshie barely makes it out of the building after an Explosion from the Suicide mission and her body is recovered by the senior group and she is rebuilt by the leader, who used to work for Kageno Steel. The protestors want a meeting to demand the return of their loved ones. They found a set of Kageno's blueprints for a bomb that's said to be "17 times more powerful than the atomic bomb" and intend to use to threaten Japan into ceding all power to them. The group then heads off to confront Kageno and his father and force them to return their cyborg relatives or reveal the bomb plot to the authorities. But the Meeting is revealed to be a trap as the father and son have also robotically modified themselves and kill most of the senior group. The leader, however, had installed a gun into his leg and uses it to kill Kageno's father. Hiraku, now freed from responsibility, activates a protocol that turns his family castle into a giant robot. Kageno reveals that he intends to drop the bomb into Mount Fuji, thus destroying Japan and himself and "freeing" everyone. The robot-castle is wired to mimic Kageno's every move.

Yoshie launches an assault on the robot-castle, defeating her former geisha sisters and the goblin girls (in a battle featuring a butt-sword duel). She confronts Kageno, but is met by Kikue who has been upgraded into a superior model of robogeisha and who has had her mind wiped. Kikue  defeats Yoshie. Knowing she has been bested, Yoshie reveals that, in fact, she was her father's favorite daughter because Kikue was actually born to their father's mistress and was looked down upon. Yoshie reminds Kikue that in fact, it was Yoshie who had defended Kikue's honor as a child and then also allowed Kikue to build their false history and become the family geisha. Finally, Yoshie confesses that she loves Kikue. These revelations manage to overcome Kikue's memory blocks and the two sisters reconcile and merge into one ultra-powerful robogeisha.

The new robogeisha confronts Kageno and trick him during their fight to have the robot-castle (which mirrors his fighting moves) stop the bomb from being dropped into Mount Fuji and launch the bomb and robot-castle into space. Once airborne, the sisters defeat Kageno and the bomb detonates, destroying the robot-castle and all inside (including, presumably, our heroes). The film ends with Yoshie imagining she and her sister living happily as real geisha.

Cast
 Aya Kiguchi as Yoshie Kasuga
 Hitomi Hasebe as Kikue Kasuga
 Takumi Saito as Hikaru Kageno
 Taro Shigaki as Kenyama Kageno
 Etsuko Ikuta as Kinu
 Suzuki Matuso as Kenta Gotokuji
 Naoto Takenaka as Rojin Kanai
 Asami Kumakiri as Kotone 
 Shôko Nakahara as Hideko
 Asami Sugiura as Onna Tengu 1

Release and reception
RoboGeisha was released in Japan on October 3, 2009 by Kadokawa Pictures. In January 2010, Funimation bought the rights to distribute the film. The film was released in North America on April 17, 2010 by way of ActionFest, then in New York City on May 18, 2010. The film circulated to different film festivals before going to DVD and Blu-ray on November 16, 2010.

Soundtrack

References

External links
 
 
 
 Official website from Funimation

2009 science fiction action films
2009 films
Japanese science fiction action films
2000s Japanese-language films
Films directed by Noboru Iguchi
2000s science fiction comedy films
2000s parody films
Japanese independent films
Japanese robot films
Cyberpunk films
Funimation
2009 independent films
2009 comedy films
2000s Japanese films